Ernest Akouassaga (born 16 September 1985, in Leconi) is a Gabonese football defender.

Career 
Akoussaga began his career with AS Mangasport and joined in summer 2003 to French club SCO Angers. He played in three years SCO Angers just nine games, who scores four goals and signed in summer 2006 a contract with Le Havre AC. Akoussaga played only eighteen games for the reserve by Le Havre AC and was transferred in summer 2007 to FC Olimpi Rustavi. After two years in the Umaglesi Liga with Rustavi, turned back to France and signed on 13 July 2009 a contract with FC Nantes.

International career 
Akoussaga is a member of the Gabon national football team.

References

External links 
 Foot National Profile
 

1985 births
Living people
Gabonese footballers
Gabon international footballers
2010 Africa Cup of Nations players
Le Havre AC players
Association football defenders
Angers SCO players
AS Mangasport players
FC Nantes players
Ligue 2 players
Gabonese expatriate sportspeople in Georgia (country)
Expatriate footballers in France
Expatriate footballers in Georgia (country)
Gabonese expatriates in France
People from Haut-Ogooué Province
21st-century Gabonese people